Marie Edwards Johnson-Calloway (April 10, 1920 – February 11, 2018) was an American artist. She worked in the fields of painting and mixed-media assemblage.

Born Marie Edwards in Pimlico, Baltimore, the African-American Johnson-Calloway first attended Coppin State Teacher's College.  Edwards taught in the Baltimore School District for several years.  In 1952 she received a Bachelor of Arts Degree at Morgan State College, Baltimore, Maryland, in art education.

In 1968 she received a Master of Arts in painting from San Jose State University as a Graduate Studies Experienced Teacher Fellow. She taught at universities and colleges in the Bay Area until she retired from teaching in 1983.

Johnson-Calloway has worked with the Bay Area Women Artists of Northern California on community-based projects. The Oakland Art Museum is among institutions which contain examples of her work. Johnson-Calloway has also taught at San Francisco State University and at the California College of Arts and Crafts. Twice-married (Arthur Johnson, M.D. and Charles Calloway. M.D.), she has two children (daughter April Watkins, and son, Art Johnson),and four grandchildren, and lived in Oakland, California. She served as president of the San Jose chapter of the NAACP, and was long active in civil rights as well.

Johnson-Calloway died in February 2018 at the age of 97.

References

1920 births
2018 deaths
20th-century American artists
20th-century American women artists
21st-century American artists
21st-century American women artists
African-American women artists
Artists from Baltimore
Artists from Oakland, California
California College of the Arts faculty
Coppin State University alumni
Mixed-media artists
Morgan State University alumni
San Francisco State University faculty
San Jose City College
San Jose State University alumni
American women academics
20th-century African-American women
20th-century African-American people
20th-century African-American artists
21st-century African-American women
21st-century African-American artists